Kim Jong-eun (born 18 February 1986 in Seoul, South Korea) is a South Korean field hockey player. At the 2008 and 2012 Summer Olympics she competed with the Korea women's national field hockey team in the women's tournament. She competed at the 2010 and 2014 Asian Games.

She won a gold medal as a member of the South Korean team at 2014 Asian Games.

References

External links
 

1986 births
Living people
South Korean female field hockey players
Asian Games medalists in field hockey
Asian Games gold medalists for South Korea
Asian Games silver medalists for South Korea
Field hockey players at the 2008 Summer Olympics
Field hockey players at the 2010 Asian Games
Field hockey players at the 2012 Summer Olympics
Field hockey players at the 2014 Asian Games
Field hockey players at the 2016 Summer Olympics
Medalists at the 2010 Asian Games
Medalists at the 2014 Asian Games
Olympic field hockey players of South Korea
Field hockey players from Seoul
Universiade medalists in field hockey
Universiade gold medalists for South Korea
South Korean Buddhists
Medalists at the 2013 Summer Universiade
20th-century South Korean women
21st-century South Korean women